The 26th National Geographic Bee was held in Washington, D.C. on May 21, 2014, sponsored by the National Geographic Society.   Soledad O'Brien hosted this event for the first time, replacing Alex Trebek.

Eighth-grader Akhil Rekulapelli, from Loudoun County, Virginia won the competition, beating out 52 other competitors representing the 50 U.S. states, Pacific territories, and Department of Defense dependent schools.

In 2014, a record number of 9 perfect scores in the national preliminary competition was recorded. As a result, a sudden-death tiebreaker took place between 8 state representatives including contestants from Alabama, Utah, Texas, Maryland, Virginia, Illinois and Washington.

Akhil Rekulapelli, the 2014 National Geographic Bee Champion, received a $50,000 scholarship, a lifetime membership to the National Geographic Society, and a trip for 2 to the Galapagos Islands. Ameya Mujumdar, the second-place finisher received $25,000. Tuvya Bergson-Michelson, the third-place finisher received $10,000, and Pranit Nanda, the fourth-place finisher, received $1,000. Other top ten finishers received $500.

2014 state representatives

References

2014 in Washington, D.C.
2014 in education
National Geographic Bee